The BLAST network is a plan for a frequent rapid transit system in the city of Hamilton, Ontario, Canada. The system is planned to include five routes, with two light rail transit (LRT) lines, and three bus rapid transit (BRT) lines.

Background 
In 1981, during Bill Davis's Progressive Conservative administration, the Province of Ontario offered to finance the construction of a light metro in Hamilton using ICTS technology, from Lloyd D. Jackson Square to the Lime Ridge Mall. The line would have used the same technology as the Scarborough RT in Toronto and the Expo Line in Vancouver. The plans triggered a lot of grass-roots opposition, and Hamilton-Wentworth Council turned the proposal down. The plan called for an elevated trackone of the elements that triggered opposition, with residents being concerned commuters would be invading their privacy, by looking down on their back-yards and in their second floor windows.

BLAST was conceived as part of the city's 2007 transportation master plan. It was later incorporated by Metrolinx as part of its regional transportation plan, The Big Move. The B-Line LRT and A-Line were among the plan's prioritized transit expansion projects and were funded by the Government of Ontario in May 2015.

By 2019, Hamilton and Metrolinx were preparing to build the B-Line (Hamilton LRT). Land acquisition and building demolition for a  line from McMaster University to Eastgate Square had started.  On December 16, 2019, the Government of Ontario announced it was cancelling its funding for the BLAST system's B-Line LRT, due to cost overruns. The provincial Ministry of Infrastructure noted that provincial funds originally planned for the Hamilton LRT project would be redistributed to other transportation infrastructure projects, with consultation with a newly formed Hamilton Transportation Task Force and Hamilton's city council. On April 9, 2020, the Hamilton Transportation Task Force released the report, suggested that the city need a "higher order transit project", and it could be either LRT on B-Line or BRT on both B-Line and A-Line.

On February 9, 2021, the province reversed its decision and reinstated the project as the Hamilton LRT.

Proposed lines 
The B-Line LRT and A-Line BRT are the top transit priorities for the City of Hamilton and were originally scheduled for completion in 2024. 

The 2017 Metrolinx Regional Transportation Plan outlines a proposed regional transportation network for service by 2041. It includes four priority bus routes and an LRT to run on the north portion of the A-Line. BRT and LRT transit lines included in Metrolinx's 2017 Regional Transportation Plan includes:

References

External links
 Light Rail Transit: City of Hamilton project page
 Hamilton LRT: Metrolinx project page
 BCA Consultation boards

Transport in Hamilton, Ontario
Passenger rail transport in Hamilton, Ontario
Proposed public transport in the Greater Toronto Area
Light rail in Canada